Hypericum triquetrifolium, commonly called curled-leaved St. John's-wort, is a species of plant of the family Hypericaceae. It is native to the Mediterranean Basin.

External links
 Comprehensive profile for Hypericum triquetrifolium. MaltaWildPlants.com

triquetrifolium
Flora of Malta